Ellen M. Bard (January 11, 1949 – October 28, 2009) was an American politician serving as a Republican member of the Pennsylvania House of Representatives.

Bard was born in Minneapolis, Minnesota. She graduated from Pomona College in 1971. She also earned a M.S. degree from the Boston University School of Public Communication in 1972 and another M.S. from the MIT Sloan School of Management in 1980. Bard was also a Marshall Scholar.

She was elected to represent Ward 7 on the Abington Township Board of Commissioners in 1990. 
In 1994, after one term as a Township Commissioner, she was elected to represent the 153rd legislative district in the Pennsylvania House of Representatives. During her tenure there, she has had 17 bills signed into law. During her legislative career, she was known for advocating on behalf of the Abington School District and for her work on energy and environmental issues, including her service as Chair of the Task Force on a 21st Century Energy Policy for Pennsylvania.

She left her PA House seat to run for Pennsylvania's 13th congressional district, losing the Republican primary to Melissa Brown, who went on to lose to Allyson Schwartz.

In May 2009, after her diagnosis with pancreatic cancer, she and her husband moved from Jenkintown to San Francisco to be near their daughter. She died in October 2009.

References

External links
 official PA House profile (archived)
 - official Party website (archived)

1949 births
2009 deaths
Politicians from Minneapolis
Republican Party members of the Pennsylvania House of Representatives
Women state legislators in Pennsylvania
MIT Sloan School of Management alumni
Boston University College of Communication alumni
Deaths from pancreatic cancer
Deaths from cancer in California
Pomona College alumni
20th-century American politicians
20th-century American women politicians
21st-century American women